Juan Benítez may refer to:

 J. J. Benítez (born 1946), Spanish author
 Juan Benítez (footballer, born 1953), Paraguayan football forward
 Juan Manuel Benítez (born 1974), Spanish journalist
 Juan Benítez (born 1990), Spanish football midfielder